Euselates is a genus of beetle belonging to the family Scarabaeidae.

List of species
 Euselates adspersa (Moser, 1906) 
 Euselates anachoralis Kriesche, 1920 
 Euselates antennata (Wallace, 1868) 
 Euselates argodi (Bourgoin, 1916) 
 Euselates bojakana Jakl & Krajcik, 2006 
 Euselates cineracea (Gory & Percheron, 1833) 
 Euselates confluens Kriesche, 1920 
 Euselates conspersa (Schoch, 1897) 
 Euselates delponti Antoine, 1987 
 Euselates dissimilis Nagai, 1986 
 Euselates fairmairei Miksic, 1974 
 Euselates furcata Kraatz, 1893 
 Euselates fuscata Paulian, 1960 
 Euselates goryi (Janson, 1892) 
 Euselates haeckelsehnali Jakl & Krajcik, 2008 
 Euselates jansoni  (Arrow, 1910) 
 Euselates katsurai Krajcik, 2005 
 Euselates kudrnaorum Jakl & Krajcik, 2008 
 Euselates laotica Miksic, 1974 
 Euselates machatschkei Ruter, 1973 
 Euselates magna Thomson, 1880 
 Euselates makovskyi Krajcik, 2005 
 Euselates moupinensis (Fairmaire, 1891) 
 Euselates neglecta Antoine, 1986 
 Euselates ornata (Saunders, 1852) 
 Euselates ornata laotica Miksic, 1974 
 Euselates perraudieri (Fairmaire, 1893) 
 Euselates perraudieri taivanica Miksic, 1974 
 Euselates perroti Antoine, 1989 
 Euselates proxima (Bourgoin, 1915) 
 Euselates pulchella (Gestro, 1891) 
 Euselates quadrilineata (Hope, 1831) 
 Euselates rufipes  (Kraatz, 1892) 
 Euselates rufipes ruteri Miksic, 1971 
 Euselates rugosicollis (Kraatz, 1892) 
 Euselates sanguinosa (Motschulsky, 1854) 
 Euselates scenica (Gory & Percheron, 1833) 
 Euselates schoenfeldti Kato, 1933 
 Euselates schoenfeldti Kraatz, 1893 
 Euselates setipes (Westwood, 1854) 
 Euselates stictica (Hope, 1847) 
 Euselates stictica luzonica Miksic, 1974 
 Euselates strasseni Miksic, 1972 
 Euselates stricticollis (Bourgoin, 1926) 
 Euselates tonkinensis Moser, 1901 
 Euselates tonkinensis formosana Moser, 1910 
 Euselates tonkinensis trivittata Kriesche, 1920 
 Euselates trifasciata (Kraatz, 1894) 
 Euselates virgata (Janson, 1892) 
 Euselates virgata pauliani Antoine, 1986 
 Euselates vitticollis (Moser, 1906) 
 Euselates vouauxi (Bourgoin, 1916) 
 Euselates whiteheadi (Waterhouse, 1900) 
 Euselates wittmeri Sabatinelli, 1983

References

 Catalogue of Life
 Biolib